LRRC3B is a gene frequently epigenetically inactivated in several epithelial malignancies and inhibits cell growth and replication. Data suggest that the LRRC3B gene could be involved in the process of carcinogenesis as a tumor suppressor gene.

References

Genes